The Town of Fleming is a Statutory Town in Logan County, Colorado, United States. The town population was 428 at the 2020 United States Census. Fleming is a part of the Sterling, CO Micropolitan Statistical Area.

History
Fleming was named for Henry Bascom Fleming, a railroad official.

Geography
Fleming is located at  (40.682874, -102.839871).

Climate
According to the Köppen Climate Classification system, Fleming has a semi-arid climate, abbreviated "BSk" on climate maps.

Demographics

As of the census of 2000, there were 426 people, 169 households, and 115 families residing in the town. The racial makeup of the town was 96.71% White, 2.35% African American, 0.23% Native American, and 0.70% from two or more races. Hispanic or Latino of any race were 2.35% of the population.

There were 169 households, out of which 30.8% had children under the age of 18 living with them, 58.6% were married couples living together, 7.7% had a female householder with no husband present, and 31.4% were non-families. 30.2% of all households were made up of individuals, and 14.8% had someone living alone who was 65 years of age or older.  The average household size was 2.52 and the average family size was 3.14.

In the town, the population was spread out, with 28.9% under the age of 18, 6.1% from 18 to 24, 23.0% from 25 to 44, 22.8% from 45 to 64, and 19.2% who were 65 years of age or older.  The median age was 39 years. For every 100 females, there were 91.9 males.  For every 100 females age 18 and over, there were 93.0 males.

The median income for a household in the town was $26,484, and the median income for a family was $31,818. Males had a median income of $25,417 versus $14,063 for females. The per capita income for the town was $12,113.  About 6.4% of families and 12.4% of the population were below the poverty line, including 23.0% of those under age 18 and 10.8% of those age 65 or over.

See also

Colorado
Bibliography of Colorado
Index of Colorado-related articles
Outline of Colorado
List of counties in Colorado
List of municipalities in Colorado
List of places in Colorado
List of statistical areas in Colorado
Sterling, CO Micropolitan Statistical Area

References

External links

Town of Fleming website
CDOT map of the Town of Fleming

Towns in Logan County, Colorado
Towns in Colorado